Method to the Maadness is the fourth studio album by British rapper Kano, released on 30 August 2010 by Bigger Picture Music. The album has contributions from several artists including Wiley, Boys Noize, Hot Chip, Chase & Status and Damon Albarn.

Background
During an interview with the blog Social Writers, Kano said that "It was really important to me that it really made sense as an album. I didn't want it to be single driven. I really wanted it to have substance in the tracks, really wanted it to the track  to mean something to me, I really wanted to experiment and make the album very exciting". He also described his progression on Method to the Maadness, as an MC from his first album Home Sweet Home: "I didn’t really know what I was doing on that album (Home Sweet Home). It's about progression with every album, learning from the last and just getting a little bit more educated and more experienced as a performer and as a recording artist, as a writer and a producer and co-producer. So, I feel I've definitely progressed".

Singles
Three singles have been released from the album: "Get Wild", featuring Aidonia and Wiley, "Upside", featuring Michelle Breeze from Why Why Peaches, and "Spaceship", featuring production from Chase & Status and additional vocals from Takura Tendayi.

Critical reception

Will Dean of The Guardian wrote that Method to the Maadnes is "a record that deserves at least a modicum of Rascalesque success." Matt Oliver of Clash concluded that "While room for improvement remains, less culpable decisions are made compared to the pleased-to conform London Town. Kano’s well back on track to reclaiming grime’s all-rounder crown." In a review for BBC Music, Sam Hesketh stated: "Kano hasn't reached the peaks of his debut album here, but when it works, Maadness works very well indeed. He's a talented rapper, and his lyrics are on point for the vast majority of the record; but let's hope he works exclusively to his strengths next time instead of trying to be experimental for the sake of it." Anna Trench of The Telegraph  wrote: "Grime star Kano’s third album is a mixed bag. Half the tracks feature guests, and although on the whole these work well, one wonders how dependant he is on his collaborators. You can still hear his roots in the raw opener 2 Left: Topic of Discussion. As a lyricist he’s impressive, particularly on "Spaceship" and "All + All Together": perceptive, current and sometimes sad, but with just the right amount of swagger and wit."

Chart performance
The album entered the UK Album Chart at number 45 despite a strong marketing push.

Track listing

References

2010 albums
Kano (rapper) albums
Albums produced by Chase & Status
Albums produced by Fraser T. Smith